Change of Fortune is the eleventh studio album by Soul Asylum. It is the follow-up to their 2012 album Delayed Reaction. It was released on March 18, 2016. It is their first album released on Entertainment One.

Track listing

Band members
 Dave Pirner –  lead vocals, rhythm guitar
 Justin Sharbono – lead guitar, backing vocals
 Winston Roye – bass
 Michael Bland – drums

References

2016 albums
Soul Asylum albums